Herdísarvík is a small bay and abandoned farm by the same name at the south coast of Reykjanes in Iceland.

Name
The name means "bay of Herdís", a common Icelandic women's name, in this case the name of a folk tale figure from the region (see: Stóra-Eldborg).

Location and access
The small bay Herdísarvík (Gullbringusýsla) with the remains of the farm and the former house of Einar Benediktsson is situated actually at the foot of Herdísarvíkurfjall. The lava covering the land, Herdísarvíkurhraun (actually 3 lava flows, partially covering each other), came down from this volcanic mountain in the form of lava falls. They had their origin in different craters of the Brennisteinsfjöll volcanic system.

Today, there is Route 427 passing by at a small distance, but the area was for a long time very remote. Access war only possible on foot, on horseback or by small boats, the lava building  a.o. reefs in the water.

History
This remote place has nevertheless an interesting history.

Winter fishing
From the Middle Ages on, many Icelanders went to the coasts in the wintertime to go fishing. This was also done at the Reykjanes coast, where till around 1925, fishermen went out in rowing boats from different places at the south coast of Reykjanes to get herring or cod.

Herdísarvík had a very good landing for small boats. This was used in special weathers even by people from Þórlákshöfn og Selvogur around Strandarkirkja for the transport of goods for the farms in the region.

And around 1900, even some new constructions were erected for winter fishing. This was practiced with rowing boats from there even till  the 1920s. The remains of the huts and small walls for fish drying can still be seen around Herdísarvík today.

Rich farm
For some centuries, the farm at this place even had a reputation for being rather rich.  There was good land down by the sea, but also up in the mountains for sheep pasture. And the farm was situated at the coast, which meant additional income from hunting of seabirds and seals, fishing, also trout angling in the nearby small lake (today a lagoon), and last but not least big quantities of drift wood, very precious in a land more or less without its own forests.

Einar Benediktsson and Hlín Johnson in Herdísarvík

It had been for some years in his possession and used by a tenant, when the rich entrepreneur, politician and literate Einar Benediktsson (1864-1940) arrived in 1932 to live here for the last years of his life. He was getting old and preferred the stillness and remoteness of this place to the stressful life in Reykjavík or bigger cities in other parts of the world which he had had the possibility to get to know.

Also, he was not alone, but had his common wife Hlín Johnson (Jónsdóttir) with him, who looked after him, and both were very hospitable. The people from Selvogur came often to the area to make hay or get ice in the winter. There was not a phone connection until 1945, neither a road before 1948. So all messages had to be transmitted personally and a steady stream of visitors was to be expected, esp. because Einar Benediktsson was a very well known author and also an early promoter of the installation of power stations and heavy industry in Iceland. In this, his grandson, Bjarni Benediktsson (born 1970), today Minister of Finance and Economic Affairs of Iceland is following his lead.

The 12 January 1940, Einar Benediktsson died in Herdísarvík, but Hlín lived there till in 1958 (she died in 1965). She was also good in running the farm and as a businesswoman, selling ice from the small lake, which she stocked in the wintertime in a hut, to fishermen from Iceland and the Faroe Islands. The farm of Krýsuvík which was also in the possession of Einar Benediktsson, was for some time without a tenant and had to be managed from Herdísarvík. Hlín let construct a road against the lava field Ögmundarhraun for transport of sheep and hay to Grindavík.

University of Iceland
Today, the land is owned by the Háskóli Íslands (University of Iceland), which  received it as a donation from Einar Benediktsson.

References

Bays of Iceland
Farms in Iceland
Historic sites in Iceland
Icelandic writers
Reykjanes

Geography articles needing infoboxes